Stanisław Jaros (January 19, 1932 – January 5, 1963) was a Polish electrician who was executed for carrying out two assassination attempts of Polish Communist leader Władysław Gomułka, and one attempt to kill Soviet leader Nikita Khrushchev.

Background 
Little is known about Jaros’ background. He was born into a working-class family in Zagórze (now a district of Sosnowiec), did not graduate from any schools, and was self-taught. Unlike most Poles during the Communist era he did not hold down a permanent job, supporting himself mostly through services he rendered to the local population, in which he used his knowledge of electromechanics. Jaros did not have a wife or children, lived in Zagórze with his mother, and had a sister.

He worked sporadically at the local coal mines and other enterprises, where he would steal explosives and fuses. He began his "career" in explosives as early as 1948, at the age of sixteen. In that year Jaros tried to steal 100 bullets from a Boilers Factory in Sosnowiec. Caught and tortured by officers of Milicja Obywatelska (MO), he was sentenced to two years in prison. In 1951 Jaros was released and decided to take revenge on the Communist government. In the same year, he blew up telephone facilities in Dąbrowa Górnicza. Then, using stolen ammonite, he blew up a utility pole at Sosnowiec Steelworks, as well as an excavator at the Kazimierz Coal Mine in Sosnowiec. To "honor" Joseph Stalin's death, in 1953, Jaros planted a bomb under a transformer at the Joseph Stalin Coal Mine (formerly known as Renard Coal Mine) in Sosnowiec.

Jaros was very careful, his bombs did not kill anybody, he never left any traces, and agents of Służba Bezpieczeństwa's local office in Katowice believed that some anti-government organization stood behind these incidents.

First assassination attempt of Gomułka and Khrushchev 
On July 15, 1959, a delegation of both Polish and Soviet governments visited the industrial regions of Zagłębie Dąbrowskie and Upper Silesia. The delegation consisted of several high-ranking officials, including Polish leader Władysław Gomułka, Soviet leader Nikita Khrushchev, and the First Secretary of the local office of the Polish Communist Party, Edward Gierek (who himself was born in Sosnowiec's district of Porąbka). Khrushchev came to Poland to celebrate the 15th anniversary of the People's Republic of Poland (see July Manifesto), and Gierek served as his and Gomułka's guide.

On July 5, 1959, the "Trybuna Robotnicza" (Worker's Tribune) daily published a map of the route of the motorcade, so that people would be able to greet the leaders. The officials travelled along Red Army Street (ulica Armii Czerwonej), the main artery of Zagórze. To honor the guests, local authorities adorned the street and buildings along it with flowers. Edward Jaros had several kilograms of ammonite – explosive used for mining purposes – six hundred detonators, and 24 rings of mining fuses, which he had stolen from a coal mine in Upper Silesia. He placed the bomb on a lime tree, next to a Communist Police station. However, upon seeing crowds of people he hesitated, anticipating that the explosion would cause widespread destruction. Finally, the time bomb constructed by Jaros exploded at 3 pm, two hours before the arrival of the officials. The report of the investigation stated: "In the hours close to the planned arrival of the motorcade, a time bomb, planted on a tree exploded. There is no doubt that the target of the attempt was to kill members of the delegation. As a result of the explosion, the tree was partly destroyed, windows in several houses broke, and one person was slightly injured by shrapnel".

Gomułka did not tell Khrushchev anything about the assassination attempt in an attempt to hide it from him. The Soviet leader, however, found out about the event, most likely from KGB agents in Poland, and was annoyed with the Polish leader.

Second assassination attempt of Gomulka 
Jaros' second attempt took place on December 3, 1961, during Gomułka's visit to Sosnowiec. This time, the leader of Polish Communist party came to the city to honor local coal miners, who every year on December 4 celebrate Saint Barbara’s Day (patron of coal miners), known in Poland as Barbórka. Like in 1959, the schedule of the visit was published by “Trybuna Robotnicza”, on December 1. Gomułka, together with other officials, planned to participate in the opening of a brand new “Porąbka” coal mine, and Jaros most likely began preparations for the assassination in the fall of 1961, two months before the visit.

The would-be assassin appeared on the chosen location in the morning of December 3, but, like in 1959, he saw that there were too many people along Krakowska Street, so he decided to postpone the explosion until the delegation came back from the opening of the mine. After waiting for a few hours, he saw a few vehicles, and came to conclusion it was Gomułka's motorcade. Jaros detonated the bomb, not knowing that Gomułka still was at the coal mine, and as a result of the explosion, two innocent people were injured.

“At about 12:06 pm, a motorcade consisting, among others, of three limousines, entered Krakowska Street. When all cars passed a house number 47, a bomb exploded, hidden in a kilometer post. Two people were injured – a girl, who was walking past, and a miner, who was returning from celebrations. Shrapnels also destroyed one of the limousines, but not the one with Gomulka” – wrote Adam Dziuba, historian of Katowice office of the Institute of National Remembrance. The girl was partially paralysed, and the miner later died in hospital.

Investigation 
Franciszek Szlachcic, who at that time was chief of security services office in Katowice, almost lost his job for failure to provide adequate security. Szlachcic himself, together with Edward Gierek, were for a while among suspects, as Władysław Gomułka believed they wanted to get rid of him to take his post.

Detectives, examining the bomb, established that the person who constructed it, was knowledgeable in electromechanics, had access to explosives, and was a local resident. A list of suspects was created, and the investigation was codenamed Antena. Special operational groups of secret services agents investigated suspects, which resulted in creation of a new list of 71 names, including Jaros. On December 20, their houses were searched. During a search at Jaros’ house, tools and explosives were found, which, as was later established, fitted with traces left on the bomb's cord. After arrest, Jaros was first placed in a jail in Będzin, and then was transferred to Central Prison in Katowice, where his cell was bugged. Together with him, Służba Bezpieczeństwa placed in the cell a secret agent, who posed as an inmate, and whose task was to cajole Jaros into talking.
On January 7, 1962, during a conversation with the agent, Jaros admitted to constructing a bomb, which exploded on December 3. Furthermore, he added that the attempt was politically motivated and that he had been handling explosives for a long time. Jaros said that in the late 1950s, he read a book titled "Last assassination attempt of Adolf Hitler”, and it gave him inspiration to organize an attempt to kill both Polish and Soviet leaders.

Trial and execution 
Both investigation and trial, which took place in Provincial Court in Katowice, were classified. The trial was relatively short – it lasted from May 9 to May 25, 1962.  For an attempt to kill top Polish and Soviet officials, Stanisław Jaros was sentenced to death and hanged on January 5, 1963.  No news of either attempt leaked to the West, and public opinion of Poland did not know anything about Jaros, either.

See also 
 Eligiusz Niewiadomski

References 

20th-century Polish criminals
1932 births
1963 deaths
1959 crimes in Poland
1961 crimes in Poland
People from Sosnowiec
Polish assassins
Executed Polish people
People executed for murder
Assassins of heads of state
Polish electricians
People executed by Poland by hanging
Failed assassins
People executed by the Polish People's Republic
Executed people from Silesian Voivodeship
Executed assassins
People executed for attempted murder